Henci Goer is an American author who writes about pregnancy and childbirth. She is the author of The Thinking Woman's Guide to a Better Birth. Her previous book, Obstetric Myths Versus Research Realities is a  resource for childbirth professionals. Goer has written consumer education pamphlets and articles for magazines such as Reader's Digest and the Journal of Perinatal and Neonatal Nursing. Previously appearing on ParentsPlace.com as the “Birth Guru,” she is currently a resident expert for the Lamaze Institute for Normal Birth Forum. Now concentrating on writing and speaking, Goer was a doula (labor support professional) for over 20 years and a Lamaze, (private interest) educator for ten.

In 1993, she received the National Association of Childbearing Centers Media Award, and in 1995 ASPO/Lamaze presented her with its President's Award in recognition of her book, Obstetric Myths and Research Realities: A Guide to the Medical Literature (1995).

Bibliography 
 Obstetric Myths Versus Research Realities: A Guide to the Medical Literature. Westport: Bergin and Garvey, 1995. (ISBN?)
 The Thinking Woman's Guide to a Better Birth. Perigee Books, 1999.
 Optimal Care in Childbirth: The Case for a Physiologic Approach. Classic Day Publishing, 2012.
www.hencigoer.com

References

External links
 Informed Choice In Childbirth Official website

American medical writers
Women medical writers
Living people
Year of birth missing (living people)